Franco Ballerini (11 December 1964 – 7 February 2010) was an Italian road racing cyclist.

Born in Florence, his greatest exploits as a rider came with his two victories in the cycling classic Paris–Roubaix, riding for the Mapei cycling team. In 1993 he was beaten on the line by Gilbert Duclos-Lassalle in an exciting Paris–Roubaix finale. Also on his palmarès or list of accomplishments there are other one-day races such as Omloop Het Volk and Paris–Brussels.

Ballerini then became manager of the Italian national cycling squad, winning the 2002 World Championships with Mario Cipollini and the 2004 Summer Olympics in Athens with ex-teammate Paolo Bettini. In 2006, 2007 and 2008 he won the World Championships with Paolo Bettini and Alessandro Ballan.

On 7 February 2010, Ballerini, a rallying fan, was seriously injured during a race in Larciano where he was participating as co-driver/navigator for professional driver Alessandro Ciardi. He died of his injuries at the Pistoia city hospital at the age of 45.

He was honored by race organizers in 2010.

Doping
Months after finishing 3rd in the 1994 Paris–Roubaix it came out that Ballerini tested positive for Salbutamol, he was not sanctioned. In 1996 after the Grand Prix de Wallonie Ballerini tested positive again this time for Ephedrine, he received a 20 day suspension.

Major results
Sources:

1986
 6th Trofeo Laigueglia
1987
 1st Tre Valli Varesine
 8th Trofeo Laigueglia
1988
 1st  Overall Cronostaffetta
 5th Trofeo Masferrer
 9th Giro dell'Umbria
1989
 1st GP Città di Camaiore
 2nd Giro di Campania
 2nd Coppa Placci
 10th Giro di Lombardia
1990
 1st Giro di Campania
 1st Paris–Brussels
 1st Grand Prix des Amériques
 1st Giro del Piemonte
 2nd Trofeo Matteotti
 3rd Gent–Wevelgem
 3rd Giro del Veneto
 3rd Millemetri del Corso di Mestre
 5th Amstel Gold Race
 7th Züri-Metzgete
1991
 1st Stage 14 Giro d'Italia
 1st Giro della Romagna
 3rd Giro di Lombardia
 5th Paris–Roubaix
 5th Giro dell'Emilia
 7th Overall KBC Driedaagse van De Panne-Koksijde
 8th Tour of Flanders
1992
 2nd Giro di Campania
 9th Tour of Flanders
1993
 1st Stage 4 Tour de France (TTT)
 2nd Paris–Roubaix
 2nd Dwars door België
 2nd Brabantse Pijl
 3rd Coppa Bernocchi
 6th Tour of Flanders
 7th Milan–San Remo
 10th Amstel Gold Race
1994
 2nd Gent–Wevelgem
 2nd Paris–Brussels
 3rd Paris–Roubaix
 4th Tour of Flanders
 5th Tre Valli Varesine
1995
 1st Paris–Roubaix
 1st Omloop Het Volk
 6th Brabantse Pijl
 8th Overall Hofbrau Cup
1996
 1st Grand Prix de Wallonie
 3rd Overall Tour of Austria
1st Stage 5
 5th Paris–Roubaix
 5th Dwars door België
 8th Coppa Bernocchi
 8th Paris–Brussels
1997
 3rd Tour of Flanders
 6th Omloop Het Volk
1998
 1st Paris–Roubaix
 2nd Overall Tirreno–Adriatico
 5th GP Industria & Artigianato di Larciano
 5th Paris–Brussels
 8th Tour of Flanders
1999
 8th HEW Cyclassics
2000
 4th Omloop Het Volk
 8th Paris–Roubaix

Grand Tour general classification results timeline

References

External links

1964 births
2010 deaths
Italian male cyclists
Italian Giro d'Italia stage winners
Road incident deaths in Italy
Sport deaths in Italy
Cyclists from Florence
Italian rally co-drivers